Tulyar (1949–1972) was an Irish bred, British-trained Thoroughbred racehorse and sire. He won The Derby, the St Leger Stakes, the King George VI & Queen Elizabeth Stakes, the Ormonde Stakes and the Eclipse Stakes setting a record for a single season's earnings in England. He stood at stud in Ireland and America, but failed to live up to expectations as a sire.

Background
Tulyar was a brown horse bred by his owner HH Aga Khan III. He was sired by Tehran and was the first foal of the mare Neocracy by the undefeated racehorse and outstanding sire, Nearco. Tehran, won six races including the St Leger Stakes for earnings of £7,258 and he was a Champion Sire. Tulyar's dam, Neocracy won two races worth £2,562 as a two-year-old. She also produced several other winners including the 1959 Eclipse Stakes winner Saint Crespin III. Neocracy's dam, Harina, won the Imperial Produce Stakes of £4,128. Harina was a full sister to the Derby and St Leger winner, Trigo. Tulyar is inbred to Phalaris in the fourth remove of his pedigree.

Racing career

1951: two-year-old season
Tulyar began his racing career by finishing unplaced in a race at Newmarket in Spring and then ran third in a race at Ascot in July. In August he was sent to York where he finished unplaced in the Acomb Stakes. In autumn, Tulyar was moved up in distance and won two races over one mile, taking Nursery Handicaps at Haydock and Birmingham. On his final appearance of the season, he finished second in the Horris Hill Stakes at Newbury.

In the Free Handicap, a rating of the best British two-year-olds, Tulyar was given a rating of 114 pounds, nineteen pounds below the top-rated Windy City.

1952: three-year-old season
On his three-year-old debut, Tulyar showed form well in advance of anything he had displayed in 1951 when he easily defeated the Middle Park Stakes winner King's Bench in the Henry VIII Stakes at Hurst Park. Tulyar did not run in the 2000 Guineas at Newmarket, in which King's Bench finished second to the French colt Thunderhead. Tulyar made his next appearance at Chester where he won the Ormonde Stakes by half a length from Nikiforos. Later in May he won the Lingfield Derby Trial by two lengths to establish himself as a contender for The Derby.

At Epsom, Tulyar started at odds of 11/2 for the Derby after a "last-minute plunge" made him favourite. Ridden by Charlie Smirke, he took the lead two furlongs from the finish and held off the late challenge of Gay Time to win by half a length in a time of 2 minutes 36.4 seconds. Shortly before the race, Smirke had sent a telegram to the Press Club which read "On Wednesday I will be saying to you What did I Tulyar". Tulyar was led into the winner's enclosure by his owner's son Prince Aly Khan. In July, Tulyar moved down in distance for the Eclipse Stakes over ten furlongs at Sandown and won "easily" from his stable companion Mehmandar. Later in the same month he contested the second running of the King George VI & Queen Elizabeth Stakes at Ascot. He won a "thrilling race" by a neck from Gay Time with the future Washington, D.C. International winner Worden in third.

In September, Tulyar started 10/11 favourite for the St Leger at Doncaster. He won by three lengths from Kingsford and eleven others.

At the end of the 1952 season, the Aga Khan sold Tulyar to the Irish National Stud 
for £250,000 which was a world record price up to that time for a Thoroughbred horse. It was originally planned that Tulyar would race in 1953, but the Irish government decided not to risk their investment and the horse was retired to stud.

Assessment and honours
At the time of his retirement from racing, Tulyar had earned £76,577, breaking the record for prize money won by a British horse which had been set fifty-seven years earlier by Isinglass. Tulyar's record stood for six years until it was beaten by Ballymoss.

Timeform awarded Tulyar a rating of 134 in 1952. He was the highest-rated European horse of the year.

Following the London & North Eastern Railway tradition of naming locomotives after winning racehorses, the English Electric 'Deltic' diesel locomotive, no. D9015 (later 55015) was named after Tulyar on 13 October 1961 and remained in service until 2 January 1982, and has been preserved.

Stud record
Tulyar commenced stud duties as a five-year-old in Ireland at a fee of 600 guineas a mare. Nominations approaching 100 every season came in from Ireland, England, France, America, Germany and Italy. These numbers were then reduced by the Directors of the Stud.

In 1955 Tulyar was sold to an American syndicate led by Arthur B. Hancock for £240,000 and his delivery was made after the 1956 stud season. His fee in America was set  at $10,000 a  mare. After arrival in the States he contracted a serious illness and he could not be used in 1957.

Tulyar sired the winners of 66 races worth £33,022. He was the damsire of the winners of 51 races worth £40,788. 
His stakes winning progeny included:
Fiorentina (IRE), won 1959 Irish 1,000 Guineas 
Ginetta (IRE), won 1959 Poule d'Essai des Pouliches 
 Mako (USA), won the American Grand National race

In America Tulyar and his sons, did have an influence on jumpers and some Warmblood horses.

Pedigree

References

1949 racehorse births
1972 racehorse deaths
Epsom Derby winners
Racehorses bred in Ireland
Racehorses trained in the United Kingdom
Thoroughbred family 22-a
St Leger winners
King George VI and Queen Elizabeth Stakes winners